Churamani Mahato is an Indian politician in the All India Trinamool Congress party. He was elected as MLA of Gopiballavpur Vidhan Sabha constituency in West Bengal Legislative Assembly in 2011 and 2016.

References

Living people
Trinamool Congress politicians from West Bengal
West Bengal MLAs 2011–2016
West Bengal MLAs 2016–2021
Year of birth missing (living people)